Hubert Douglas Delany (born December 31, 1993) is an American politician serving as a member of the Connecticut House of Representatives for the 144th District, representing Stamford, Connecticut. Delany, a Democrat is a U.S. Army sergeant who served as a photojournalist, a writer and, a mass communications specialist.

Early life
Hubert Douglas Delany III was born on December 31, 1993, to parents Deborah Butler and Hubert Delany Sr. II, at Stamford Hospital in Stamford, Connecticut. Delany grew up in both Stamford and nearby Wilton for the first few years of his life. As a teenager growing up in Stamford’s Waterside district, Hubert helped create Stamford’s first Diversity Festival.

Delany is the great-grandson of Hubert Thomas Delany, an American civil rights pioneer, a lawyer, politician, Assistant U.S. Attorney, the first African American Tax Commissioner of New York and one of the first appointed African American judges in New York City. Delany's two great-grand aunts Sadie and Bessie Delany, wrote the autobiographical bestseller Having Our Say: The Delany Sisters' First 100 Years, which tracked the family's genealogy dating back through 18th-century enslavement. His twice great-grandfather, Henry Beard Delany (1858—1928), was born enslaved, but became the first African American Bishop Suffragan of the Episcopal Church (United States). Other notable family members include Harlem Renaissance poet Clarissa Scott Delany and American author, science fiction writer and literary critic, Samuel R. Delany.

Connecticut General Assembly

Elections
Delany ran as a Democrat in a 2022 special election for the 144th district in the Connecticut House of Representatives to replace representative Caroline Simmons, who resigned to become mayor of Stamford. He won the election against Republican candidate Danny Melchionne.

References

External links
United States Army Boots to Ballots: Registering Soldiers to Vote
United States Army Digital Visual Portfolio for Sergeant Hubert Douglas Delany III

1993 births
Living people
Democratic Party members of the Connecticut House of Representatives
African-American state legislators in Connecticut
Politicians from Stamford, Connecticut
United States Army non-commissioned officers
American photojournalists
United States Army reservists